Rita Engedalen (born 17 December 1971) is a Norwegian blues musician (vocals, guitar) and songwriter. Rita Engedalen and Margit Bakken were top billing at the Sunflower Blues Festival in August 2015 in Clarksdale, Mississippi, United States. A few days later she performed at the Shack Up Inn in a smaller setting.

Career 
Engedalen is one of the most established blues musicians in Norway, and often performs with Margit Bakken as the duo Women in Blues. She won the blues category of the Spelleman Award in 2006. She won the second European Blues Challenge in 2012.

Discography 
 Hear My Song (Bluestown Records, 2004)
 Heaven ain't Ready for Me Yet (Bluestown Records, 2006)
 The Tree Still Standing (Grammofon, 2008)
 Women in Blues (2012), with Margit Bakken

References

External links 
 

Spellemannprisen winners
Norwegian singer-songwriters
Norwegian songwriters
Norwegian blues singers
Norwegian blues guitarists
English-language singers from Norway
Living people
Musicians from Kongsberg
1971 births
21st-century Norwegian singers
21st-century Norwegian women singers